Bhella is a tehsil in the Doda district of Jammu and Kashmir. It was previously part of the Thathri tehsil. In 2022, Bhella became the part of Bhaderwah Assembly constituency.

References

Doda district